John Leonard Swigert Jr. (August 30, 1931 – December 27, 1982) was an American NASA astronaut, test pilot, mechanical engineer, aerospace engineer, United States Air Force pilot, and politician. In April 1970, as command module pilot of Apollo 13, he became one of twenty-four astronauts who flew to the Moon.

Before joining NASA in 1966, Swigert was a civilian test pilot and fighter pilot in the Air National Guard. After leaving NASA, he ran for Senate but lost in a primary election against Bill Armstrong. Later he ran for Congress, but while running was diagnosed with cancer. He won the election for Colorado's new 6th district in 1982, but died before being sworn in.

Early life
John Leonard Swigert Jr. was born on August 30, 1931, in Denver, Colorado, to parents John Leonard Swigert Sr. (1903–1973) and Virginia Swigert (1906–1993). Swigert's father was an ophthalmologist. At the age of 14, he became fascinated by aviation. While he would have been content just watching planes take off from nearby Combs Field, young Jack became determined to do more than be a spectator. He took on a newspaper route to earn money for flying lessons, and by age 16 he was a licensed private pilot. He was a member of the Boy Scouts of America and attained the rank of Second Class Scout. He attended Blessed Sacrament School, Regis Jesuit High School, and East High School, from which he graduated in 1949.

Swigert received a Bachelor of Science degree in mechanical engineering from the University of Colorado in 1953, where he also played football for the Buffaloes. He later earned a Master of Science degree in aerospace engineering from the Rensselaer Polytechnic Institute (Hartford campus) in 1965, and a Master of Business Administration degree from the University of Hartford in 1967.

His recreational interests included golf, handball, bowling, skiing, swimming, and basketball. His hobbies included photography.

Flight experience

Following his graduation from Colorado in 1953, Swigert joined the United States Air Force (USAF). Upon graduation from the Pilot Training Program and Gunnery School at Nellis Air Force Base, Nevada, he was assigned as a fighter pilot in Japan and South Korea. In 1953, he survived his plane crashing into a radar unit on a Korean airstrip.

After completing his tour of active duty in the USAF, he served as a jet fighter pilot with the Massachusetts (1957–1960) and Connecticut Air National Guard (1960–1965). Swigert held a position as engineering test pilot for North American Aviation before joining NASA. He was previously an engineering test pilot for Pratt & Whitney, from February 1957 to June 1964.

He logged over 7,200 hours in flight, including more than 5,725 hours in jet aircraft.

NASA career
After unsuccessfully applying for NASA's second and third astronaut selections, Swigert was accepted into the NASA Astronaut Corps as part of NASA Astronaut Group 5 in April 1966. Swigert became a specialist on the Apollo command module: he was one of the few astronauts who requested to be command module pilots.

Swigert was a member of Apollo 7's astronaut support crew, the first support crew for an Apollo mission.

Apollo 13

Swigert was one of three astronauts aboard the Apollo 13 Moon mission launched April 11, 1970. Originally part of the backup crew for the mission, he was assigned to the mission three days before launch, replacing astronaut Ken Mattingly. The prime crew had been exposed to German Measles (the rubella virus) from Charles Duke and, because Mattingly had no immunity to the disease, NASA did not want to risk him falling ill during critical phases of the flight.

The mission was the third crewed lunar-landing attempt, but was aborted after the rupture of an oxygen tank in the spacecraft's service module. Swigert was the astronaut who first announced, "Houston, we've had a problem here". The statement was then repeated by commander of the flight Jim Lovell. Swigert, along with fellow astronauts Lovell and Fred Haise, traveled around the Moon and returned safely to Earth on April 17 after about 5 days and 23 hours, and received the Presidential Medal of Freedom the next day.

Apollo–Soyuz Test Project 
NASA Director of Flight Crew Operations Deke Slayton, who selected the astronauts, recommended Swigert as command module pilot for the Apollo–Soyuz Test Project, the first joint mission with the Soviet Union. Slayton felt Swigert deserved another chance to fly after having been selected for Apollo 13 two days before launch, and performing well.

During 1972, the Apollo 15 postal covers incident caused NASA investigators to inquire into other astronauts. A number of Apollo astronauts, including Swigert, had made agreements with West German stamp dealer Hermann Sieger, who originated the idea for the Apollo 15 covers, to autograph philatelic items in exchange for a payment of about $2,500. Swigert originally denied involvement when interviewed by NASA investigators. According to Christopher C. Kraft, the investigators subpoenaed his bank records, finding more funds than expected, and records of a predated charitable donation. Swigert's subsequent admission caused NASA Deputy Administrator George M. Low to remove him from Apollo–Soyuz.

Post-NASA career
Aware that his spaceflight career was most likely over, Swigert took a leave of absence from NASA in April 1973 and went to Washington, D.C. to become executive director of the Committee on Science and Astronautics, U.S. House of Representatives.

Swigert eventually left NASA and the committee in August 1977 to enter politics. He ran for the U.S. Senate in 1978, but was soundly defeated in the Republican primary in September by Congressman Bill Armstrong, who was far better known. In 1979, Swigert became vice president of B.D.M. Corporation in Golden. He left in 1981 to join International Gold and Minerals Limited as vice president for financial and corporate affairs.

In February 1982, Swigert left International Gold and Minerals Limited to run for U.S. Congress in the newly created 6th district as a Republican. Swigert developed a malignant tumor in his right nasal passage, which he disclosed to voters. Doctors told him he would finish radiation treatments June 15 and make a complete recovery. But in August, Swigert developed back pain and was diagnosed with bone marrow cancer. On November 2, 1982, he won the seat with 64% of the popular vote.

Death
On December 19, 1982, seven weeks after his election, he was airlifted from his home in Littleton to Georgetown University Hospital in Washington, D.C. He died of respiratory failure at its Lombardi Cancer Center on December 27, seven days before the beginning of his congressional term, aged 51. He was the last member-elect of the House to die before taking office until Luke Letlow's death from COVID-19 in December 2020.

Fifteen astronauts, including fellow Apollo 13 crewmates Jim Lovell and Fred Haise,  were among the thousand mourners at his full military honors funeral in Denver, presided over by Archbishop James Casey, which included a missing man flyover by A-7 Corsairs of the Colorado Air National Guard. He is buried alongside his parents in Mount Olivet Cemetery in Wheat Ridge.

Awards, honors, and organizations

Swigert received the American Institute of Aeronautics and Astronautics (AIAA) Octave Chanute Award for 1966 for his participation in demonstrating the Rogallo wing as a feasible land landing system for returning space vehicles and astronauts.

President Richard Nixon awarded the Presidential Medal of Freedom to the Apollo 13 crew shortly after the conclusion of their mission. Following a sparse parade, Swigert received the City of New York Gold Medal on June 3. He received the City of Houston Medal for Valor, 1970. Swigert received the American Astronautical Society Flight Achievement Award for 1970. He was given University of Colorado-Boulder's Distinguished Engineering Alumnus Award in 1970. Vice President Spiro Agnew presented the crews of Apollo 11, 12, and 13 with the NASA Distinguished Service Medal in 1970. The Apollo 13 crew also received the AIAA Haley Astronautics Award in 1971, which included a small monetary award and a medal.

Swigert was awarded the 1972 Antonian Gold Medal.

He was presented an Honorary Doctorate of Science degree from American International College in 1970, an Honorary Doctorate of Laws degree from Western State University in 1970, and an Honorary Doctorate of Science from Western Michigan University in 1970.

In 1983, Swigert was among 14 Apollo astronauts inducted into the International Space Hall of Fame.

In 1988, Swigert was inducted into the Colorado Aviation Hall of Fame.

In 1995, Swigert was portrayed by Kevin Bacon in Ron Howard's film Apollo 13.

In 1997, Swigert, along with 23 other Apollo astronauts, was posthumously inducted into the U.S. Astronaut Hall of Fame. He was elected in September 2003 to the Rensselaer Polytechnic Institute Alumni Hall of Fame.

In 1997, a statue of Swigert made by George and Mark Lundeen was placed on display in the U.S. Capitol Building as one of two statues given by the state of Colorado to the National Statuary Hall Collection. As of December 2008 the statue is on display in Emancipation Hall in the United States Capitol Visitor Center. A duplicate statue is currently on display at Denver International Airport.

The Space Foundation was founded in 1983 in part to honor the memory and accomplishments of Swigert.  In 2004, the Space Foundation launched the John L. "Jack" Swigert Jr. Award for Space Exploration, which is presented annually to an individual, group, or organization that has made a significant contribution to space exploration.  On August 18, 2009, the Space Foundation and Colorado Springs District 11 partnered to open the Jack Swigert Aerospace Academy.

Swigert was a member of numerous organizations. He was a fellow of the American Astronautical Society; associate fellow of the Society of Experimental Test Pilots and the American Institute of Aeronautics and Astronautics; and member of the Quiet Birdmen, Phi Gamma Delta, Pi Tau Sigma, and Sigma Tau.

See also
 Fred Haise
 Jim Lovell
 Astronaut-politician
 List of members-elect of the United States House of Representatives who never took their seats
 List of spaceflight records
 The Astronaut Monument

References

Works cited

External links

Jack Swigert at the Internet Movie Database

1931 births
1982 deaths
1970 in spaceflight
20th-century American businesspeople
20th-century American engineers
American astronaut-politicians
American business executives
American aerospace engineers
American mechanical engineers
American test pilots
Apollo 13
Apollo program astronauts
Aviators from Colorado
Colorado Buffaloes football players
Deaths from cancer in Washington, D.C.
Deaths from multiple myeloma
Elected officials who died without taking their seats
Republican Party members of the United States House of Representatives from Colorado
Military personnel from Connecticut
NASA civilian astronauts
Politicians from Denver
Presidential Medal of Freedom recipients
Recipients of the NASA Distinguished Service Medal
Rensselaer Polytechnic Institute alumni
United States Air Force officers
Massachusetts National Guard personnel
United States Astronaut Hall of Fame inductees
University of Colorado Boulder alumni
University of Hartford alumni
Connecticut National Guard personnel